Club Deportivo Cultural Juanjuí (sometimes referred as Cultural Juanjuí) is a Peruvian football club, playing in the city of Juanjuí, Mariscal Cáceres, San Martín, Peru.

History
The Club Deportivo Cultural Juanjuí was founded on February 2, 1942 by Ricardo López, David Arévalo, Gaspar López, among others.

In the 1972 Copa Perú, the club classified to the Final Stage, but was eliminated when finished in 5th place.

Currently, the club participates in the Liga Distrital de Juanjuí.

Honours

Regional
Liga Departamental de San Martín:
Winners (5): 1968, 1969, 1970, 1971, 1988

Liga Provincial de Mariscal Cáceres:
Winners (3): 1968, 1969, 1970

See also
List of football clubs in Peru
Peruvian football league system

References

Football clubs in Peru
Association football clubs established in 1942
1942 establishments in Peru